David Dennison Jones (born November 9, 1968) is a former American football tight end. He played for the Los Angeles Raiders in 1992.

Born in East Orange, New Jersey and raised in Hillside, New Jersey, Jones played prep football at Hillside High School.

References

1968 births
Living people
American football tight ends
Delaware State Hornets football players
San Diego Chargers players
Los Angeles Raiders players
Hillside High School (New Jersey) alumni
People from East Orange, New Jersey
People from Hillside, New Jersey
Players of American football from New Jersey
Sportspeople from Hudson County, New Jersey